Ambury Regional Park (also known as Ambury Farm) is a regional park situated on the coast of Manukau Harbour, in Auckland in New Zealand's North Island. It is situated in the suburb of Māngere Bridge and in the local board area of Māngere-Ōtāhuhu, to the west of Māngere Mountain.

The park is a working sheep and dairy farm with a woolshed and milking shed. There are also goats, cows, pigs, chickens, turkey, rabbits and peacocks. Areas of the park are leased to the Mangere Pony Club, and the Ambury Park Centre for Riding Therapy, a charity which opened in 1985, which provides physiological and psychological therapy through horse riding.

The parks hosts the Ambury Farm Day each year. It is the largest annual event organised by Auckland Council, and gives families free access to a working farm.

Geography

It includes both wamping coastline and grazed farming paddocks.

There are several examples of basalt lava flows, originating from the Māngere Mountain about 18,000 years ago. Most other lava flows around Auckland have been destroyed during urban development.

There are rare examples of oioi-coastal needle grass on saline margins of lava flows, as well as patches of salt marsh, salt marsh and broadleaved scrub.

Shorebirds migrate to the park in large numbers during summer months. Large numbers of migratory birds feed here during the summer months. Tōrea (South Island pied oystercatcher) and ngutuparore (wrybill) migrate north from the South Island after breeding. Kuaka (bar-tailed godwit) and huahou (red knot) migration from overseas. Kōtuku ngutupapa (royal spoonbill) also migrate to the area.

Birdwatchers have identified a total of 86 birds in the park including little shags, and white-faced herons.

History

There is an extensive history of Māori settlement in the Māngere Mountain area, and there are 95 archaeological sites around the park.

Following the start of European settlement, parts of the park were used for sewage treatment. Over  of oxidation ponds were decommissioned,  of shoreline were restored, beaches were constructed, and 27,000 trees were planted in New Zealand's largest coastal restoration project, which was officially completed in 2005.

In 1985, a fuel pipeline between Marsden Point and Auckland Airport was laid through the park. The route is marked by white fenceposts, farm gate tags and triangular marine markers.

In December 1986, the Ambury Regional Park was the site of a large-scale Mongrel Mob convention, where over 300 members attended, during which gang members helped complete the rock retaining walls along the Manukau waterfront. A kidnapping and sexual assault at this event became national news.

The annual Ambury Farm Day began in 1988. By 2009, 35,000 people attended the event. By the early 2000s, the park had become a popular school excursion, with 3-4 schools booked per week visiting the working farm.

A new concept plan for the park was developed in 2009, which included linking it up to nearby walk and cycling tracks. By that stage, 25,000 people were visiting the park each year outside of the annual farm day.

Recreation

There are a range of facilities, including public toilets and barbecues. The campground can accommodate up to 60 people.

Transport

The park is connected by walkway and cycleway to the Māngere Bridge to Onehunga in the north-east, and the Ihumātao to the south. It is within walking distance to the nearest bus stop, and the nearest train station is Onehunga railway station.

Gallery

References 

Māngere-Ōtāhuhu Local Board Area
Parks in Auckland
Regional parks of New Zealand
Sheep farming in New Zealand
Tourist attractions in the Auckland Region
Protected areas of the Auckland Region
Shearing sheds
Farms in New Zealand